The fourth USS Gridley (DDG-101) is the 51st  in the United States Navy. Gridley is named after Captain Charles Gridley, Commander of Admiral George Dewey's flagship , (Flag Captain) and recipient of Admiral Dewey's famous command, "You may fire when you are ready, Gridley" in the Battle of Manila Bay during the Spanish–American War.

Construction and career 
In May 2004, the Secretary of the Navy announced the names of five new Arleigh Burke-class destroyers, including Gridley. Her keel was laid on 30 July 2004 at the Bath Iron Works in Bath, Maine. She was christened on 11 February 2006. The Gridley was commissioned at the Port of Miami on Saturday, 10 February 2007.

She has joined the Pacific Fleet and is homeported at Naval Station Everett.

Gridley departed Naval Base San Diego on 19 May 2008 for her maiden deployment and returned on 25 November 2008.

On 9 July 2016 Gridley arrived at her new homeport in Everett, Washington.

Gridley participated in RIMPAC 2022.

References

External links

 Official Ship's Site

 

Arleigh Burke-class destroyers
Ships built in Bath, Maine
2005 ships
Carrier Strike Group One